This article provides details of international football games played by the Sweden national football team from 2020 to present.

Results

2020

2021

2022

Head to head records

Notes

References

Sweden national football team results by decade
2020s in Swedish sport